Kiss Him, Not Me, known in Japan as , is a Japanese romantic comedy manga series written and illustrated by Junko. It was serialzed in Kodansha's Bessatsu Friend magazine from April 2013 to February 2018. Fourteen tankōbon have been released. It is published in English by Crunchyroll for online releases and by Kodansha USA in print. The manga won Best Shōjo Manga at the 40th Kodansha Manga Awards.

An audio drama adaptation of the first chapter was released in January 2015. An anime adaptation by Brain's Base aired in Japan between October and December 2016. A live-action film adaptation was released in July 2020.

Plot
Kae Serinuma is a fujoshi, a female otaku who loves reading yaoi and imagining men together in romantic relationships, both fictional and real. When one of her favorite anime characters is killed off, Kae is so shocked that she locks herself in her room for a whole week. When she eventually comes out, she discovers that she has lost a lot of weight. She becomes a beautiful girl that catches the eye of four boys at her school: Yūsuke Igarashi, Nozomu Nanashima, Hayato Shinomiya, and Asuma Mutsumi. Despite learning about Kae's bizarre tendencies, the four boys, along with another fujoshi named Shima Nishina, all fall for Kae and begin competing with each other for her affection, much to Kae's frustration as she wants them to fall in love with each other.

Characters

Main characters

Played by: Miu Tomita (pre-weight loss form), Nonoka Yamaguchi (weight loss form) (live-action film)
Kae is a fujoshi in her second year of high school and part of the history club, who becomes excited over the sight of two boys together. Initially overweight, Kae loses weight after a week of mourning over the death of her favorite anime character, becoming more slender and attractive as a result. Despite becoming the object of affection for several boys as a result, she still thoroughly enjoys her otaku hobbies and is unsure how to deal with the attention she gets from the boys. 

Played by: Fuju Kamio (live-action film)
Igarashi is one of Kae's classmates, who is part of the soccer club. He is characterized as "the boy next door" type. After spending more time with Kae, he gets to know her more as a person and falls in love with who she is.

Played by: Asahi Ito (live-action film)
Nozomu is one of Kae's classmates, who is categorized as a "bad boy" type and resembles Shion, her favorite character from Mirage Saga. He used to be a soccer player when he was much younger, but lost confidence following an incident with Yūsuke. Although he portrays a tough exterior, he is actually quite soft-hearted and very kind when he wants to be. He has a younger sister and is good at housekeeping. In Junko other work, Star⇄Crossed, it confirm in Chapter 6.5 that he is dating Hayato Shinomiya

Played by: So Okuno (live-action film)
He is a first year student and member of the health committee, who started having a crush on Kae after she lost weight. He has an effeminate appearance, prone to blushing and getting flustered, and is often characterized as a tsundere by the other boys. He owns a female iguana named Thor, whom he cares for dearly. In Junko other work, Star⇄Crossed, it confirm in Chapter 6.5 that he is dating Nanashima Nozomu

Played by: Hokuto Yoshino (live-action film)
A third year student who is president of the history club and one of the few people who liked Kae before she lost her weight, but doesn't realize it until later on in the series. While more laid back and less competitive than the other boys, he can become aggressive when someone picks on Kae. He's very open minded and doesn't seem to notice nor mind any of Kae's otaku eccentricities.

Played by: Satsuki Nakayama (live-action film)
An androgynous first year girl who is the descendant of a rich family and is skilled in both sports and arts. According to the boys, she is "Takarazuka-like prince type". Like Kae, she is also a fujoshi and even runs her own dōjin circle. Having had trouble being respected for her art due to her family's status, Shima came to admire Kae from even before her transformation after she complimented her work thus receiving the motivation to pursue drawing.

Secondary characters

Played by: Miku Uehara (live-action film)
She has a boyfriend who is unaware of her hobbies.

Played by: Shuto Miyazaki (live-action film)
Kae's older brother.

Asuma's older brother.

Played by: Naho Toda (live-action film)
Kae's mother.

Kae's father, who is very protective of her.

Kae's childhood friend. His parents are divorced and he lives with his father, but uses his mother's maiden name. He is later revealed to be a voice actor and provides the voice to Akane from Kanchu Ranbu.

Nozomu's little sister, who enjoys the magical girl anime, Puri Puri Moon.

Others

Shion is Kae's favorite character in her favorite anime, Mirage Saga, who dies in the show, shocking her.

A character in Mirage Saga.

A character in Kanchu Ranbu who is modeled after fictional samurai Hyakki Sametora.

A character in Kanchu Ranbu, he is a anthropomorphized version of Hyakki Sametora's iconic red armor.

Production

Junko had been creating yaoi manga professionally since her debut in 2009, and after reading some of her works, a staff member from Bessatsu Friend invited her to contribute to the magazine. Junko decided to focus on an otome game concept, and after the editors had asked her to make the series comedic, Eiki Eiki suggested making jokes about fujoshi culture. Junko created Shima when she wanted to add a new male character to Kae's group and later decided to make her female.

Media

Manga

Originally titled Boys, Please Kiss Him Instead of Me in Japan, the manga is written and illustrated by Junko. It was serialized in Kodansha's monthly manga magazine Bessatsu Friend from April 13, 2013 to February 13, 2018. Kodansha published fourteen tankōbon volume of the series.

Crunchyroll began releasing the manga in English online on September 5, 2014. A contest was held to determine the series' official English title, with Kiss Him, Not Me winning. Kodansha USA began publishing the physical edition in English on October 13, 2015.

Volume list

Anime
An anime television adaptation of the manga was announced in the Bessatsu Friend magazine's April 2016 issue. Brain's Base produced the anime, with Hiroshi Ishiodori directing, Michiko Yokote handled the series composition and Kazuhiko Tamura designed the characters. The series aired in Japan from October 6 to December 22, 2016 and was simulcast by Crunchyroll, while Funimation streamed the English dub. Following Sony's acquisition of Crunchyroll, the dub was moved to Crunchyroll. Anime Limited has licensed the series in the UK.

Episode list

Film
A live-action film adaptation was announced in January 2020 and had a nationwide theatrical release in Japan on July 10, 2020. The film was directed by Norihisa Hiranuma, who also wrote the script along with Nami Kikkawa, Shōhei Fukuda, Kei Watanabe, and Daisuke Kamijō. It stars The Rampage from Exile Tribe member Hokuto Yoshino as Mutsumi, Asahi Ito as Nanashima, Fuju Kamio as Igarashi, and So Okuno as Shinomiya. E-girls member Nonoka Yamaguchi and Miu Tomita both star as Kae, with Yamaguchi playing her slim form and Tomita playing her pre-weight loss form. The theme song is "Watashi ga Motete Dōsunda" by Girls² (Misaki Tsuruya, Youka Ogawa, Kurea Masuda, Kira Yamaguchi, and Ran Ishii), who also make cameo appearances in the film. The extras in the film were played by students from EXPG. Additional cast members were announced on March 6, 2020 with the release of the film's official trailer, consisting of Miku Uehara, Ryōtarō Sakaguchi, Marina Mizushima, Zawachin, Satsuki Nakayama, Naho Toda, Shuto Miyazaki, and Mio Yūki. In addition, Asahi Ito, who plays Nanashima, also provides the voice to Shion. The dance sequence at the end of the film was choreographed by Akane from Tomioka High School's dance club, who is known for choreographing the "bubbly dance."

Kentarou Muramatsu from Cinema Today gave the film 4 out of 5 stars, stating that the story was "a little rough" but that it "corrects" social norms, with extra praise towards Tomita's performance.

Reception

Kiss Him, Not Me sold a cumulative total of over 3 million physical copies in Japan since January 2020. Volume 3 of the manga reached the 44th place on the weekly Oricon manga chart and, as of June 15, 2014, has sold 17,994 copies; volume 4 reached the 43rd place and, as of September 14, 2014, has sold 22,107 copies; volume 5 reached the 17th place and, as of January 18, 2015, has sold 41,112 copies.

The manga won Best Shōjo Manga at the 40th Kodansha Manga Awards. It was number four on the 2015 Kono Manga ga Sugoi! Top 20 Manga for Female Readers survey.

Publishers Weekly stated that the work is "a well-played farce filled with both laughter and empathy, no doubt helped by the author's background in yaoi."

Notes

References

External links
Kiss Him, Not Me on Crunchyroll

Brain's Base
Crunchyroll anime
Japanese audio dramas
Kodansha manga
LGBT harem anime and manga
Live-action films based on manga
Male harem anime and manga
Manga adapted into films
Romantic comedy anime and manga
Shochiku films
Shōjo manga
TBS Television (Japan) original programming
Winner of Kodansha Manga Award (Shōjo)
Japanese romantic comedy films
Yaoi anime and manga